Peyrieu is a commune in the Ain department in eastern France.

Town located 11 km south of Belley. It is on the right bank of the Rhône in the area of AOC wines of Bugey.

Population

The inhabitants of the town of Peyrieu are Peyriolans.

See also
Communes of the Ain department

References

Communes of Ain
Ain communes articles needing translation from French Wikipedia